These quarterbacks have started at least one game for the Los Angeles Rams of the National Football League. The Rams were formerly known as the St. Louis Rams and the Cleveland Rams. The players are listed in order of the date of each player's first start at quarterback for the Rams.

Regular season

The number of games they started during the season is listed to the right:

Postseason

Most games as starting quarterback 
The following quarterbacks have the most starts for the Rams in regular season games. Bold text indicates the player is currently on the team's roster.

Team Career Passing Records 
(Through the 2021 NFL Season)

See also
List of NFL starting quarterbacks

References and Footnotes 

Lists of National Football League quarterbacks by team

quarterbacks